Martine Denise Stiemer (born 4 May 1973) is a Dutch former softball player. She played as a outfielder for the Netherlands women's national softball team and HCAW. She competed in the women's tournament at the 1996 Summer Olympics.

References

External links
 

1973 births
Living people
Dutch softball players
Olympic softball players of the Netherlands
Softball players at the 1996 Summer Olympics
People from Veenendaal
Sportspeople from Utrecht (province)
20th-century Dutch women